Howden was a town and rail station in Fort Bend County, Texas. It was just north of Juliff, and south of Arcola. It was served by the International–Great Northern Railroad via the Columbia Branch. 

A church cemetery served the community at one time, but it has not been located.

References

Unincorporated communities in Fort Bend County, Texas